Roy William Cotton (born 14 November 1955) is an English retired amateur footballer who played as a winger in the Football League for Brentford, Orient and Aldershot and later in the Australian National Soccer League.

Playing career 
A graduate of the Brentford youth team, Cotton began his career as an amateur and after signing his first professional contract, he made his professional debut in December 1973. He departed the club in July 1974, after making just two appearances. Cotton moved to Second Division club Orient and scored prolifically for the reserve team, but made just three league appearances during the 1975–76 season. He dropped back down to the Fourth Division to join Aldershot in July 1976 and made five appearances for the club. After his departure in 1978, Cotton joined Southern League Premier Division club Hillingdon Borough. Cotton moved to Australia in 1979 and played for National Soccer League clubs St George (two spells), Sydney Olympic, Wollongong City (two spells) and Penrith City.

International career 
At international level, Cotton represented the England Youth team.

Personal life 
Cotton lives in Australia and has held senior corporate positions with Mercedes-Benz, Audi Australia and in real estate.

Career statistics

References

1955 births
Living people
Footballers from Fulham
English footballers
England youth international footballers
Association football wingers
Tottenham Hotspur F.C. players
Brentford F.C. players
Leyton Orient F.C. players
Aldershot F.C. players
Hillingdon Borough F.C. players
St George FC players
Sydney Olympic FC players
Wollongong Wolves FC players
Penrith City SC players
English Football League players
Southern Football League players
National Soccer League (Australia) players
English expatriate footballers
English expatriate sportspeople in Australia

External links 
 Aussie Footballers Costello to Crook